Annie Ewart (born 29 September 1993) is a Canadian former racing cyclist. She rode at the 2014 UCI Road World Championships.

Major results

2013
 4th Time trial, Pan American Road Championships
2014
 8th Chrono Gatineau
2015
 1st Stage 2 Tour of the Gila

References

External links

1993 births
Living people
Canadian female cyclists
Sportspeople from Victoria, British Columbia
Royal Roads University alumni